Handshoe is an unincorporated community within Knott County, Kentucky, United States. Its post office  is closed.

References

Unincorporated communities in Knott County, Kentucky
Unincorporated communities in Kentucky